Ailerán, also known as Ailerán sapiens (Ailerán the Wise) was an Irish scholar and saint who died on 29 December 664 or 665. His feast day is 29 December.

Biography
Ailerán was one of the most distinguished scholars at the School of Clonard in the 7th century.

His early life is not recorded, but he was attracted to Clonard by the fame of Saint Finnián and his disciples. He became lector of the school in 650. He died of the Yellow Plague, and his death is recorded in the Annals of Ulster. Because of his knowledge of the works of Origen, Philo, St. Jerome, St. Augustine, and others, he was well versed in patristic literature.

Works

According to John Colgan, numerous works can be ascribed to Ailerán, including the Fourth Life of Saint Patrick, a Latin litany, and the Lives of Saint Brigid and Saint Féichín of Fore. Ailerán's best known work is his mystical interpretation of the Ancestry of Our Lord Jesus Christ, according to the genealogy of Jesus in Saint Matthew's Gospel. This was published in the Benedictine edition of the Fathers, and the editors said that they published it although Aileran was not a Benedictine, because he " unfoulded the meaning of the Sacred Scripture with so much learning and ingenuity that every student of the Sacred Volume and especially preachers of the Divine Word will regard the publication as most acceptable." Another work of his is titled A Short Moral Explanation of the Sacred Names, which could be a fragment of a larger work.

Notes

References
 Ailerani Interpretatio Mystica Progenitorum Domini Iesu Christi - Aidan Breen, ed., Four Courts Press, 1995.
 Scribe as artist, not monk: the canon tables of Ailerán ‘the Wise’ and the Book of Kells - Douglas Mac Lean, Peritia 17 (2003), pp. 433–468.

External links
 
 
 
 http://brigid-undertheoak.blogspot.com/2009/12/scholars-of-clonard-poem-of-sedulius.html
 http://www.ucc.ie/peritia/abstract10.html
 

664 deaths
7th-century Christian monks
7th-century Christian saints
7th-century Irish writers
7th-century Latin writers
7th-century scholars
7th-century deaths from plague (disease)
Medieval Irish saints
Irish Christian monks
People from County Meath
Year of birth unknown
Irish Latinists
Colombanian saints